"World in Our Hands" is a song by English singer-songwriter Taio Cruz from his third studio album, TY.O. The track was released as the album's fourth single in Germany on 27 July 2012 and served as the official anthem for the ZDF coverage of the 2012 Summer Olympics. The track was written by Cruz, Michael Zitron, Rami Yacoub, Carl Falk and Iain James, and produced by Falk, Yacoub and Cruz.

Music video
The official music video for the track premiered on 5 July 2012, at a total length of three minutes and 26 seconds. The video features footage of the 2008 Summer Olympics held in Beijing, intertwined with footage of Cruz performing the song with a live band on a jetty.

Track listing
 CD single
 "World in our Hands" – 3:19
 "There She Goes" (Moto Blanco Remix) – 3:25

Charts

Year-end charts

Certifications

Credits and personnel
Lead vocals – Taio Cruz
Producers – Rami Yacoub, Carl Falk, Taio Cruz
Lyrics – Taio Cruz, Michel Zitron, Rami Yacoub, Carl Falk, Iain James
Label: Island Records

Release history

References

2012 singles
Taio Cruz songs
Songs written by Iain James
Songs written by Michel Zitron
Songs written by Taio Cruz
2011 songs
Songs written by Rami Yacoub
Songs written by Carl Falk
Island Records singles
Song recordings produced by Rami Yacoub